Divisions and namesakes of the American F. W. Woolworth Company,  and divisions of Woolworths Group (Australia).

Similar namesake companies in South Africa and Australia were legally named after the Woolworth company as permitted by the trademark laws of the period, but never had any financial connection to the original F. W. Woolworth Company. The reorganized American company is currently known as Foot Locker.

References

•List
•List
Woolworth divisions